Black Butte Ranch is a census-designated place (CDP) and unincorporated private resort community in Deschutes County, Oregon, United States. The population was 366 at the 2010 census. Black Butte Ranch allows public access to its restaurant, golf courses and horse stables, but is primarily oriented to its year-round residents and seasonal guests.

History
The planned community of Black Butte Ranch was developed starting in 1970 by Brooks Resources, a subsidiary of Brooks-Scanlon Lumber Company on the site of the former Black Butte cattle ranch directly south of Black Butte. The first residents arrived in 1971 and Black Butte Ranch post office was established the same year.

As of December 2013, the president and CEO of Black Butte Ranch is Scott Huntsman, and the chairman of the Board of Directors is Mark Pilkenton.

Geography

Black Butte Ranch is located in northwestern Deschutes County to the southwest of U.S. Route 20; it is surrounded by Deschutes National Forest. The  summit of Black Butte overlooks the community to the northeast.

The area drains east via Black Butte Swamp to Indian Ford Creek, then Whychus Creek, then to the Deschutes River, a north-flowing tributary of the Columbia River.

Demographics

In 2001, the estimated population of full-time, year-round residents was 337. The population was 366 at the 2010 census. During the peak tourist season, the population, including guests who do not own property but are renting residences within the community, is estimated to rise to 5,000.

Wildfire
Black Butte Ranch has been threatened by many wildfires, especially since 2002, when the Cache Mountain Fire burned two homes in the northwest corner of the ranch. Black Butte Ranch was once again threatened by the B&B Complex Fires in 2003, and in 2007 the GW Fire came within a quarter of a mile of some homes on the ranch.

References

External links
Black Butte Ranch official website

Census-designated places in Oregon
Planned communities in the United States
Unincorporated communities in Deschutes County, Oregon
1970 establishments in Oregon
Census-designated places in Deschutes County, Oregon
Unincorporated communities in Oregon